Tomoyasu is a masculine Japanese given name.

Possible writings
Tomoyasu can be written using many different combinations of kanji characters. Some examples:

友康, "friend, healthy"
友安, "friend, peaceful"
友靖, "friend, peaceful"
友泰, "friend, peaceful"
友保, "friend, preserve"
知康, "know, healthy"
知安, "know, peaceful"
知泰, "know, peaceful"
知保, "know, preserve"
知易, "know, divination"
智康, "intellect, healthy"
智安, "intellect, peaceful"
智靖, "intellect, peaceful"
共安, "together, peaceful"
朋泰, "companion, peaceful"
朝靖, "morning/dynasty, peaceful"
朝安, "morning/dynasty, peaceful"
朝保, "morning/dynasty, preserve"

The name can also be written in hiragana ともやす or katakana トモヤス.

Notable people with the name
, Japanese footballer
, Japanese footballer
, Japanese footballer
, Japanese musician
, Japanese Go player
, Dutch-trained Japanese physician

Japanese masculine given names